Terttu Aulikki Rautawaara (May 2, 1906, Vaasa — December 29, 1990, Helsinki) was a Finnish soprano. She was famous for her interpretation of works by Edvard Grieg and Jean Sibelius, including some of the first recordings of Sibelius made outside Scandinavia. She played the part of Countess Almaviva in Mozart's The Marriage of Figaro, in the first ever opera performed at the Glyndebourne festival (1934), and continued to play a number of parts in operas staged in Glyndebourne in the 1930s. She recorded many duets with Peter Anders, among others. She also appeared in British and German films in the 1930s (e.g. the German comedy Alles hört auf mein Kommando). In 1945, Jean Sibelius dedicated the Hymn to Thaïs to her.

Aulikki Rautawaara was briefly married to the Finnish composer Erik Bergman, from 1956 to 1958, that being her third marriage.

References

External links 
 Recordings on ArkivMusic
 Finnish Wikipedia article

1906 births
1990 deaths
People from Vaasa
Finnish sopranos
20th-century Finnish women opera singers